is a skiing venue located in Nozawaonsen, Nagano, Japan.

Nozawa Onsen Village is located at the foot of the ski resort, which spans across three main areas. The resort is a large ski area that opened over seventy years ago.

Covering , the southern part of the resort was used for biathlon competitions at the 1998 Winter Olympics.The Olympic venue consisted of two trails each  in length along with a firing range consisting of 30 stations.

References

External links
 1998 Winter Olympics official report. Volume 2. pp. 230–2.
 Official tourist website 
 Official village site 
 The Nozawa Onsen Guide
 Nozawa Onsen snow report

Venues of the 1998 Winter Olympics
Ski areas and resorts in Japan
Olympic biathlon venues
Sports venues in Nagano Prefecture
Nozawaonsen, Nagano